Fingers at the Window is a 1942 mystery film directed by Charles Lederer and released by Metro-Goldwyn-Mayer.

Plot
An axe murderer in Chicago has already killed six victims. The police, led by Inspector Gallagher with psychiatrist Dr. Immelman consulting, have arrested a different man for each crime, but all of them are impervious to interrogation, lost in a state of paranoid schizophrenia. All are institutionalized.
 
A mysterious figure in the shadows counsels a seventh man, a seemingly harmless bird shop owner, that he must kill a dancer named Edwina Brown (Laraine Day), because she is his enemy and has ruined his life. He hands him an axe, and the man goes after her as she walks home at night. Actor Oliver Duffy (Lew Ayres) is walking home after his play has closed, and sees the man shadowing her; he intervenes and escorts her home. The man with the axe tries to get in her window; Oliver keeps watch on the fire escape outside her window all night, preventing another attempt near dawn.

The next day, Oliver takes measures for Edwina's safety as she returns from work, sending a taxi (with her cat in it) to take her home, and arranging a dummy figure in her bed while they wait in the other room. The bird-shop owner gets in the window and attacks the dummy with the axe; they raise the alarm, and he is captured. At the police station, he too is unreachable, obsessively rearranging little slips of paper with meaningless writing (Oliver later recognizes it as mirror writing) on it. Oliver gives one of these to Edwina as a souvenir, and the police put her up in a hotel for the night.

When another stranger takes down the fire axe and tries to get into Edwina's room to kill her, Oliver deduces that the crimes are not random. He believes that someone is hypnotizing different people to commit each murder, but his far-fetched hypothesis leaves the police and Edwina skeptical. Inspector Gallagher says the "mastermind" theory is hackneyed, though he does let drop the fact that the names of all seven men who did the murders begin with B. Edwina lived and danced in Paris, and has some secret connected with her time there that she refuses to talk about, but she alleges that there would be no reason for anyone to want to kill her.
 
Oliver goes to the psychiatric hospital where all the arrested men are kept, and pretends to be schizophrenic in order to get in and investigate. He delights Dr. Immelman with his paranoid act, which gives him scope to break into his file cabinet and look under the "B"s. All seven men who did the axe murders are there, in order, as patients of another psychiatrist at the hospital, Dr. Santelle (Basil Rathbone). Oliver concludes that the mastermind who is hypnotizing the patients to murder must he a psychiatrist. He escapes, gets to Edwina and takes her to a seminar that will be attended by every psychiatrist in the city, to see if she knows any of them. She does not, but Dr. Santelle is not there.
 
They go to his house, and when he sees who is calling, he gets his butler to impersonate him in surgical gown and mask. Edwina thinks she does not know him. As they wait for an "L" (elevated) train, someone pushes Oliver off the platform; he manages to drop through the ties and fall to the street. As he lies, bruised but not seriously hurt, in the hospital, Edwina finally tells him her awful secret: she was engaged to a man named Cesar in Paris, he suddenly left her with no word or warning, and she thought being jilted made her seem undesirable. He pooh-poohs this, and they declare their love.

Edwina goes to wait outside while Oliver rests, and a doctor comes in and gives him an injection. It turns out to be Dr. Santelle, who explains that he has given Oliver an overdose of insulin and he will soon die, so he might as well tell him where Edwina is. Oliver passes out without doing so; as Santelle leaves, Edwina spots him and recognizes him as Cesar. She follows him. Oliver knocks over a pitcher, a nurse investigates and a doctor saves him with a glucose injection. Oliver manages to get the police to go to Dr. Santelle's house, though they think he is crazy and they are saving Santelle from him.

Santelle catches Edwina and forces her inside, where he reveals his reason for getting his patients to kill the seven men: he is not actually Santelle, but impersonated him to claim his large inheritance in Chicago when Santelle died in Paris. This was why he left her so abruptly. All seven men who were killed had known the real Santelle; When Edwina, who knows he's really Cesar, is dead, no one will know he is an impersonator. As he is about to kill her, the police arrive, and he locks her in a closet while he answers the door. The police are convinced that Oliver is crazy until one of them spots the piece of paper Edwina had got from the lunatic on the floor. "Santelle" shoots at the police in an attempt to get away, and Gallagher shoots him dead. Oliver and Edwina are happily reunited and plan to marry immediately.

Cast
 Lew Ayres as Oliver Duffy	
 Laraine Day as Edwina Brown
 Basil Rathbone as Dr. H. Santelle
 Walter Kingsford as Dr. Cromwall
 Miles Mander as Dr. Kurt Immelman
 Charles D. Brown as Inspector Gallagher
 Cliff Clark as Lt. Allison
 James Flavin as Lt. Schaeffer
 Russell Gleason as Ogilvie
 William Tannen as Devlan
 Mark Daniels as Haguey
 Bert Roach as Krum
 Russell Hicks as Dr. Chandley
 Charles Wagenheim as Fred Bixley
 Robert Homans as Officer O'Garrity
 Byron Foulger as Bird Man (uncredited)

Reception

Box office
The film made $288,000 in the US and Canada and $260,000 elsewhere, making a profit of $29,000.

Critical
The New York Times wrote, "this intended 'chiller' is decidedly soft and lukewarm," whereas Leonard Maltin called it an "Entertaining mystery".

Leslie Halliwell, in the 7th. Edition of his famous Film Guide, mistakenly mis-described Basil Rathbone's character as a "Stage magician" who "Hypnotises lunatics".
He called it "Slow- starting"; a film which "Never achieves top gear", on page 347.

References

External links
 
 Fingers at the Window at TCMDB
 
 

1942 films
1942 crime drama films
1940s mystery drama films
1942 directorial debut films
American black-and-white films
American crime drama films
American mystery drama films
Films directed by Charles Lederer
Films scored by Bronisław Kaper
Films set in Chicago
Metro-Goldwyn-Mayer films
1940s English-language films
1940s American films